Verlinden is a surname. Notable people with the surname include:

 Annelies Verlinden (born 1978), Belgian politician
 Dany Verlinden (born 1963), Belgian footballer
 Filip Verlinden (born 1982), Belgian kickboxer
 Joeri Verlinden (born 1988), Dutch swimmer
 Julia Verlinden (born 1979), German politician
 Rob Verlinden (born 1950), Dutch gardener and television presenter
 Sam Verlinden (born 1997), New Zealand singer
 Thibaud Verlinden (born 1999), Belgian footballer

See also
20798 Verlinden, main-belt asteroid

Dutch-language surnames